The Syncystidae are a family of parasitic alveolates in the phylum Apicomplexa. Species in this family infect insects (Aeshnidae).

History

This family was described by Schneider in 1886.

Taxonomy

One genus and two species (Syncystis aeshnae, Syncystis mirabilis) are currently recognised in this family.

The type species is Syncystis mirabilis Schneider 1886.

Lifecycle

The development of these parasites is mostly intracellular.  Merogony results in the formation of about 150 elongate, slender merozoites which become spheroidal as they differentiate into amoeboid or spheroidal gamonts.

The gamonts associate in syzygy and subdivide into gametes. Fusion of the gametes leads to numerous zygotes within the gametocyst which is either spherical or bilobed.  Numerous (30 to 150) oocysts are formed per gametocyst.

The oocysts are navicular and have three or four spines extending from each pole of the wall. Eight sporozoites form per oocyst.

References

Conoidasida
Apicomplexa families